Eugene Macalalag "Geno" Espineli (born September 8, 1982) is a former Major League Baseball relief pitcher for the San Francisco Giants.

Early life
Espineli was born in Houston, Texas to Filipino parents born in the Philippines who migrated to the United States. He also has two older sisters who were also born in Houston, Lorene and Theresa. Lorene is a mathematics teacher at the Bentley School in Lafayette, California.

Career
Espineli played college baseball for the Texas Longhorns and TCU Horned Frogs.  With TCU, he was named to the All-Conference USA Tournament Team in 2004. In 2002 and 2003, he played collegiate summer baseball with the Cotuit Kettleers of the Cape Cod Baseball League. He was drafted by the San Francisco Giants in the 14th round of the 2004 Major League Baseball Draft.

He was named a PCL All-star and also to the U.S. Olympic team before being called up to the majors on July 20. He made his debut that same day, pitching one scoreless inning.

When Espineli made his debut with San Francisco on July 23, with 0.2 innings of perfect relief against the visiting Washington Nationals, many believe he became the first full-blooded Filipino to ever play in the major leagues.

Espineli signed a minor league contract with an invitation to 2011 spring training with the Colorado Rockies. On May 13, 2011, Espinelli signed a minor league contract with the San Francisco Giants. He finished the season with the Fresno Grizzlies and retired after the season.

Eugene is currently the first and only full-blooded Filipino playing for the Dirtbags in the world renowned Denver NABA league.  (25WAA)

References

External links

San Francisco Chronicle article

1982 births
American baseball players of Filipino descent
Baseball players from Houston
Colorado Springs Sky Sox players
Connecticut Defenders players
Cotuit Kettleers players
Fresno Grizzlies players
Living people
Major League Baseball pitchers
People from Katy, Texas
Salem-Keizer Volcanoes players
San Francisco Giants players
San Jose Giants players
TCU Horned Frogs baseball players
Texas Longhorns baseball players
Gigantes de Carolina players
Venados de Mazatlán players
American expatriate baseball players in Mexico